Avin International S.A. is active in the transportation of crude oil, gas and petroleum products. Avin is one of the world's independent shipment oil operators owned by the Vardinoyannis family.

Other activities
The company has been active in undertaking various shipbuilding programs, in USA, Split, Japan, Ukraine, South Korea, and recently China.

See also

 Energy in Greece

References

Transport companies established in 1977
Greek brands
Oil and gas companies of Greece
Petroleum transport
Multinational companies headquartered in Greece
Shipping companies of Greece
Greek companies established in 1977
Energy companies established in 1977